Boxhalle is an indoor arena located in Olympiapark in Munich, Germany. For the 1972 Summer Olympics, it hosted the boxing events and the judo finals.

References
1972 Summer Olympics official report. Volume 2. Part 2. pp. 193–4.

Venues of the 1972 Summer Olympics
Indoor arenas in Germany
Olympic boxing venues
Olympic judo venues
Buildings and structures in Munich
Sports venues in Bavaria
Boxing venues in Germany